Lake Charles may refer to:

Canada
Lake Charles (Nova Scotia), a lake in Halifax
Lake Charles, in Guysborough County, a lake in Nova Scotia
Lake Charles, Ontario, a community of Georgian Bluffs

United States
Lake Charles (Illinois), a reservoir
Lake Charles (Louisiana), a lake 
Lake Charles, Louisiana, a city
Lake Charles Air Force Station
Lake Charles Historic District
Lake Charles Regional Airport
Lake Charles station
Lake Charles, a lake at Dodge City Community College, Kansas
Lake Charles State Park, Arkansas

See also